List of all members of the Storting in the period 1985 to 1989. The list includes all those initially elected to Storting.

There were a total of 157 representatives, distributed among the parties: 71 to Norwegian Labour Party, 50 to Conservative Party of Norway, 16 to Christian Democratic Party of Norway, 12 to Centre Party (Norway), 6 to Socialist Left Party and 2 to Progress Party (Norway)

Aust-Agder

Vest-Agder

Akershus

Buskerud

Finnmark

Hedmark

Hordaland

Møre and Romsdal

Nordland

Oppland

Oslo

Rogaland

Sogn and Fjordane

Telemark

Troms

Nord-Trøndelag

Sør-Trøndelag

Vestfold

Østfold

 
Parliament of Norway, 1985–89